Cerro Azul is a village and municipality in Misiones Province in north-eastern Argentina.

Climate

References

Populated places in Misiones Province